This is a list of people who were born in the Indian state of Arunachal Pradesh.

Mountaineers
Tapi Mra – mountaineer from India and the first person from Arunachal Pradesh to scale Everest
Anshu Jamsenpa – Everester 4 times
Tine Mena – Everester

Social activists
Nabam Atum
Binny Yanga

Freedom Fighters
Moje Riba

Journalists

Mamang Dai – journalist, author, poet, and former civil servant based in Itanagar, Arunachal Pradesh
Dibang – Aaj Tak journalist; his mother is from Arunachal Pradesh; his father is Punjabi

Politics and bureaucracy
Pema Khandu – CM of Arunachal Pradesh
Kalikho Pul – ex-CM of Arunachal Pradesh
Gegong Apang – former CM of Arunachal Pradesh
Mukut Mithi – former CM of Arunachal Pradesh; Lt. Governor of Puducherry
Rajani Kanta Patir – former Chief Secretary of Arunachal Pradesh
Kiren Rijiju – BJP Member of Parliament; Union minister 
Takam Sanjoy – INC Member of Parliament
Jomin Tayeng – first IAS Officer of Arunachal Pradesh; MLA from Dambuk
Prem Khandu Thungon – first Chief Minister of Arunachal Pradesh
Nabam Tuki – ex-CM of Arunachal Pradesh
Ninong Ering – Member of Parliament from Arunachal Pradesh and Former Union Minister
Jarbom Gamlin – ex-CM and former MP
Shakuntala Doley Gamlin – former Chief Secretary and secretary for department of empowerment of person with disabilities
Daying Ering – politician

Religious leaders
Talom Rukbo – father of the Donyi-Polo movement

Philosophers
Tamo Mibang – Vice-Chancellor; Head of Department of Tribal Studies of Rajiv Gandhi University

References 

Arunachal Pradesh
People from Arunachal Pradesh
people from Arunachal Pradesh